The 2013–14 Regionalliga was the sixth season of the Regionalliga, the second under the new format, as the fourth tier of the German football league system. The champions of Regionalliga Nord – Holstein Kiel – and Regionalliga Nordost – RB Leipzig – as well as Regionalliga Südwest runners-up SV Elversberg were promoted to the 3. Liga. Alemannia Aachen, Babelsberg 03 and Kickers Offenbach were relegated from 3. Liga.

Regionalliga Nord 

18 teams from the states of Bremen, Hamburg, Lower Saxony and Schleswig-Holstein competed in the second season of the reformed Regionalliga Nord. 15 teams were retained from the last season and 3 teams were promoted from the Oberliga – Niedersachsenliga champions Eintracht Braunschweig II and the two Regionalliga North promotion playoff winners Eintracht Norderstedt (4th place Oberliga Hamburg) and SV Eichede (champions Schleswig-Holstein-Liga). Three teams were relegated, unless the number of teams decreased below 18 for the following season. In this case, the best relegated team stayed in the league. Any further spots were allocated to the promotion play-off participants.

League table

Top goalscorer

Regionalliga Nordost 

16 teams from the states of Berlin, Brandenburg, Mecklenburg-Vorpommern, Saxony, Saxony-Anhalt and Thuringia competed in the second season of the reformed Regionalliga Nordost. 13 teams were retained from the last season and 2 teams that were promoted from the Oberliga. Viktoria 89 qualified by winning NOFV-Oberliga Nord and Wacker Nordhausen qualified by winning NOFV-Oberliga Süd. A maximum of two clubs were relegated.

League table

Top goalscorers

Regionalliga West 

19 teams from North Rhine-Westphalia competed in the second season of the reformed Regionalliga West: 15 teams were retained from the last season, Alemannia Aachen were relegated from 3. Liga and three teams were promoted from the Oberliga. Uerdingen 05 won Oberliga Niederrhein), and Lippstadt 08 and Wattenscheid 09 finished first and second in (Oberliga Westfalen). Two teams were relegated to achieve an 18-team league in the following season.

League table

Top goalscorer

Regionalliga Südwest 

18 teams from Baden-Württemberg, Hesse, Rhineland-Palatinate and Saarland competed in the second season of the newly formed Regionalliga Südwest. 14 teams were retained from last season and 3 teams were promoted from the Oberliga: Neckarelz won the Oberliga Baden-Württemberg, Baunatal won the Hessenliga, and Zweibrücken won the Oberliga Rheinland-Pfalz/Saar). Kickers Offenbach were denied a license for the 3. Liga and also played in the Regionalliga Südwest. Depending on developments in 3. Liga, a minimum of two teams were relegated.

League table

Top goalscorer

Regionalliga Bayern 

19 teams from Bavaria competed in the second season of the newly formed Regionalliga Bayern. 17 teams were retained from the last season and 2 teams were promoted from the Bayernliga. Schweinfurt 05 won Bayernliga Nord and Schalding-Heining won Bayernliga Süd. The bottom three teams were relegated, the two teams ranked 15th and 16th entered a play-off round.

League table

Top goalscorer

Promotion play-offs
The draw for the 2013–14 promotion play-offs was held on 26 April, with another draw between the Regionalliga Südwest teams held on 13 May 2014.

SC Freiburg II, runners-up of the Regionalliga Südwest, did not submit license documents for the 3. Liga. Therefore, Mainz 05 II, third in the Regionalliga Südwest, took the spot.

Summary
The first legs were played on 28 May, and the second legs were played on 1 June 2014.

Matches
All times Central European Summer Time (UTC+2)

Mainz 05 II won 5–1 on aggregate.

Sonnenhof Großaspach won 1–0 on aggregate.

2–2 on aggregate. Fortuna Köln won on away goals.

References 

2013-14
4
Ger